A Stranger's Heart (working title Brokenhearted) is a Hallmark Channel made-for-TV movie that premiered on May 5, 2007.

Plot summary
Callie Morgan (Samantha Mathis), a workaholic magazine editor who prides herself on having no emotional attachments in her life, changes practically overnight when she undergoes a life-saving heart transplant operation. Not only does Callie find herself strangely drawn to a young girl who happens to be the heart donor's orphaned daughter, but she also finds unlikely romance with another patient who also recently received a new heart. She soon discovers that the man, named Jasper Cates (Peter Dobson), received the heart from her donor's husband.

Cast
 Samantha Mathis as Callie Morgan
 Peter Dobson as Jasper Cates
 Mary Matilyn Mouser as Sarah 'Cricket' Cummings
 Gina Hecht as Darlene
 Kevin Kilner as Doc Jackson
 Raynor Scheine as Frank
 Amanda Carlin as Rose
 Thomas Kopache as Duds (Callie's father)
 June Squibb as Aunt Cass
 W. Morgan Sheppard as Fred Landreth (Cricket's grandfather)
 Garth McLean as Jasper's Brother-in-law

References

External links
 
 
 A Stranger's Heart at Hallmark Channel
 A Stranger's Heart at RHI Entertainment

2007 television films
2007 films
American romantic drama films
American coming-of-age films
Films about dysfunctional families
Films about human rights
Films about philosophy
Films about reincarnation
Films about religion
Love stories
Hallmark Channel original films
Films directed by Andy Wolk
2007 romantic drama films
American drama television films
2000s American films